Freedom to Fly is the third studio album by guitarist Tony MacAlpine, released in 1992 through Shrapnel Records (United States) and Roadrunner Records (Europe).

Track listing

Personnel
Tony MacAlpine – guitar, keyboard, piano
Mike Terrana – drums
Larry Dennison – bass
Robert Margouleff – mixing, production
Brant Biles – engineering, mixing
Colin Mitchell – mixing assistance
Rusty Richards – mixing assistance
Bernie Grundman – mastering

References

External links
In Review: Tony MacAlpine "Freedom To Fly" at Guitar Nine Records

Tony MacAlpine albums
1992 albums
Shrapnel Records albums
Albums produced by Robert Margouleff